The 2005 San Diego Padres season was the 37th season for the San Diego Padres. The 2005 team is noted as having the weakest record among any team to qualify for the postseason, finishing 82-80, tied with the 1973 New York Mets for the fewest wins ever in a non-strike year since Major League Baseball expanded to a 162-game season in 1961, and the fewest of any team since 1885. The NL West was weak in 2005, with all teams finishing below the .500 mark except for the San Diego Padres, who only finished 2 games above the .500 mark. The closest team, the Arizona Diamondbacks, were 5 games back. Three teams in the Eastern Division finished with better records than San Diego but failed to qualify for the playoffs, such as the Phillies, who won 88 games and won all six of their games against the Padres. There had been some speculation that the Padres would be the first team in MLB history to win a division and finish below .500, but their victory over the Los Angeles Dodgers on September 30 gave them their 81st victory, guaranteeing a split record. They were swept in three games by the St. Louis Cardinals in the 2005 NLDS.

Offseason
December 22, 2004: Mark Sweeney was signed as a free agent with the San Diego Padres.

Regular season

Opening Day starters
Played at Coors Field on April 4, 2005.  The Colorado Rockies defeated the Padres 12-10.

Season standings

National League West

Record vs. opponents

Game log

|- align="center" bgcolor="#ffbbbb"
| 1 || April 4 || @ Rockies || 10–12 || || || || || 0–1
|- align="center" bgcolor="#bbffbb"
| 2 || April 6 || @ Rockies || 14–6 || || || || || 1–1
|- align="center" bgcolor="#bbffbb"
| 3 || April 7 || Pirates || 1–0 || || || || || 2–1
|- align="center" bgcolor="#ffbbbb"
| 4 || April 8 || Pirates || 2–3 || || || || || 2–2
|- align="center" bgcolor="#bbffbb"
| 5 || April 9 || Pirates || 11–3 || || || || || 3–2
|- align="center" bgcolor="#ffbbbb"
| 6 || April 10 || Pirates || 3–6 || || || || || 3–3
|- align="center" bgcolor="#bbffbb"
| 7 || April 11 || @ Cubs || 1–0 || || || || || 4–3
|- align="center" bgcolor="#bbffbb"
| 8 || April 13 (1) || @ Cubs || 8–3 || || || || || 5–3
|- align="center" bgcolor="#ffbbbb"
| 9 || April 13 (2) || @ Cubs || 3–8 || || || || || 5–4
|- align="center" bgcolor="#ffbbbb"
| 10 || April 15 || @ Dodgers || 0–4 || || || || || 5–5
|- align="center" bgcolor="#ffbbbb"
| 11 || April 16 || @ Dodgers || 3–8 || || || || || 5–6
|- align="center" bgcolor="#ffbbbb"
| 12 || April 17 || @ Dodgers || 0–6 || || || || || 5–7
|- align="center" bgcolor="#bbffbb"
| 13 || April 18 || Giants || 7–2 || || || || || 6–7
|- align="center" bgcolor="#bbffbb"
| 14 || April 19 || Giants || 5–2 || || || || || 7–7
|- align="center" bgcolor="#ffbbbb"
| 15 || April 20 || Dodgers || 1–3 || || || || || 7–8
|- align="center" bgcolor="#bbffbb"
| 16 || April 21 || Dodgers || 6–1 || || || || || 8–8
|- align="center" bgcolor="#ffbbbb"
| 17 || April 22 || @ D-backs || 3–5 || || || || || 8–9
|- align="center" bgcolor="#ffbbbb"
| 18 || April 23 || @ D-backs || 1–2 || || || || || 8–10
|- align="center" bgcolor="#ffbbbb"
| 19 || April 24 || @ D-backs || 6–8 || || || || || 8–11
|- align="center" bgcolor="#bbffbb"
| 20 || April 25 || @ Giants || 5–3 || || || || || 9–11
|- align="center" bgcolor="#ffbbbb"
| 21 || April 26 || @ Giants || 5–6 || || || || || 9–12
|- align="center" bgcolor="#ffbbbb"
| 22 || April 27 || @ Giants || 3–10 || || || || || 9–13
|- align="center" bgcolor="#bbffbb"
| 23 || April 29 || D-backs || 5–4 || || || || || 10–13
|- align="center" bgcolor="#bbffbb"
| 24 || April 30 || D-backs || 2–0 || || || || || 11–13
|-

|- align="center" bgcolor="#ffbbbb"
| 25 || May 1 || D-backs || 2–5 || || || || || 11–14
|- align="center" bgcolor="#bbffbb"
| 26 || May 2 || Rockies || 5–4 || || || || || 12–14
|- align="center" bgcolor="#bbffbb"
| 27 || May 3 || Rockies || 2–1 || || || || || 13–14
|- align="center" bgcolor="#bbffbb"
| 28 || May 4 || Rockies || 8–7 || || || || || 14–14
|- align="center" bgcolor="#bbffbb"
| 29 || May 5 || @ Cardinals || 8–3 || || || || || 15–14
|- align="center" bgcolor="#bbffbb"
| 30 || May 6 || @ Cardinals || 6–5 || || || || || 16–14
|- align="center" bgcolor="#bbffbb"
| 31 || May 7 || @ Cardinals || 5–4 || || || || || 17–14
|- align="center" bgcolor="#ffbbbb"
| 32 || May 8 || @ Cardinals || 5–15 || || || || || 17–15
|- align="center" bgcolor="#bbffbb"
| 33 || May 9 || @ Reds || 6–5 || || || || || 18–15
|- align="center" bgcolor="#ffbbbb"
| 34 || May 10 || @ Reds || 1–5 || || || || || 18–16
|- align="center" bgcolor="#bbffbb"
| 35 || May 11 || @ Reds || 7–2 || || || || || 19–16
|- align="center" bgcolor="#bbffbb"
| 36 || May 13 || Marlins || 3–2 || || || || || 20–16
|- align="center" bgcolor="#bbffbb"
| 37 || May 14 || Marlins || 2–1 || || || || || 21–16
|- align="center" bgcolor="#bbffbb"
| 38 || May 15 || Marlins || 12–4 || || || || || 22–16
|- align="center" bgcolor="#bbffbb"
| 39 || May 16 || Braves || 5–3 || || || || || 23–16
|- align="center" bgcolor="#bbffbb"
| 40 || May 17 || Braves || 3–2 || || || || || 24–16
|- align="center" bgcolor="#bbffbb"
| 41 || May 18 || Braves || 8–4 || || || || || 25–16
|- align="center" bgcolor="#bbffbb"
| 42 || May 20 || @ Mariners || 6–1 || || || || || 26–16
|- align="center" bgcolor="#ffbbbb"
| 43 || May 21 || @ Mariners || 3–5 || || || || || 26–17
|- align="center" bgcolor="#ffbbbb"
| 44 || May 22 || @ Mariners || 0–5 || || || || || 26–18
|- align="center" bgcolor="#bbffbb"
| 45 || May 24 || @ D-backs || 9–5 || || || || || 27–18
|- align="center" bgcolor="#ffbbbb"
| 46 || May 25 || @ D-backs || 11–12 || || || || || 27–19
|- align="center" bgcolor="#bbffbb"
| 47 || May 26 || @ D-backs || 10–0 || || || || || 28–19
|- align="center" bgcolor="#bbffbb"
| 48 || May 27 || @ Giants || 9–3 || || || || || 29–19
|- align="center" bgcolor="#bbffbb"
| 49 || May 28 || @ Giants || 5–3 || || || || || 30–19
|- align="center" bgcolor="#bbffbb"
| 50 || May 29 || @ Giants || 9–6 || || || || || 31–19
|- align="center" bgcolor="#bbffbb"
| 51 || May 30 || Brewers || 2–1 || || || || || 32–19
|- align="center" bgcolor="#bbffbb"
| 52 || May 31 || Brewers || 8–4 || || || || || 33–19
|-

|- align="center" bgcolor="#ffbbbb"
| 53 || June 1 || Brewers || 2–5 || || || || || 33–20
|- align="center" bgcolor="#ffbbbb"
| 54 || June 2 || Cubs || 0–5 || || || || || 33–21
|- align="center" bgcolor="#bbffbb"
| 55 || June 3 || Cubs || 6–2 || || || || || 34–21
|- align="center" bgcolor="#ffbbbb"
| 56 || June 4 || Cubs || 5–11 || || || || || 34–22
|- align="center" bgcolor="#ffbbbb"
| 57 || June 5 || Cubs || 0–4 || || || || || 34–23
|- align="center" bgcolor="#ffbbbb"
| 58 || June 7 || Indians || 0–2 || || || || || 34–24
|- align="center" bgcolor="#ffbbbb"
| 59 || June 8 || Indians || 1–6 || || || || || 34–25
|- align="center" bgcolor="#bbffbb"
| 60 || June 9 || Indians || 3–2 || || || || || 35–25
|- align="center" bgcolor="#ffbbbb"
| 61 || June 10 || White Sox || 2–4 || || || || || 35–26
|- align="center" bgcolor="#bbffbb"
| 62 || June 11 || White Sox || 2–1 || || || || || 36–26
|- align="center" bgcolor="#ffbbbb"
| 63 || June 12 || White Sox || 5–8 || || || || || 36–27
|- align="center" bgcolor="#ffbbbb"
| 64 || June 14 || @ Tigers || 4–8 || || || || || 36–28
|- align="center" bgcolor="#ffbbbb"
| 65 || June 15 || @ Tigers || 2–8 || || || || || 36–29
|- align="center" bgcolor="#ffbbbb"
| 66 || June 16 || @ Tigers || 1–3 || || || || || 36–30
|- align="center" bgcolor="#ffbbbb"
| 67 || June 17 || @ Twins || 4–5 || || || || || 36–31
|- align="center" bgcolor="#bbffbb"
| 68 || June 18 || @ Twins || 7–2 || || || || || 37–31
|- align="center" bgcolor="#bbffbb"
| 69 || June 19 || @ Twins || 5–1 || || || || || 38–31
|- align="center" bgcolor="#bbffbb"
| 70 || June 20 || Dodgers || 1–0 || || || || || 39–31
|- align="center" bgcolor="#bbffbb"
| 71 || June 21 || Dodgers || 2–1 || || || || || 40–31
|- align="center" bgcolor="#ffbbbb"
| 72 || June 22 || Dodgers || 4–6 || || || || || 40–32
|- align="center" bgcolor="#ffbbbb"
| 73 || June 23 || Dodgers || 3–4 || || || || || 40–33
|- align="center" bgcolor="#ffbbbb"
| 74 || June 24 || Mariners || 5–14 || || || || || 40–34
|- align="center" bgcolor="#bbffbb"
| 75 || June 25 || Mariners || 8–5 || || || || || 41–34
|- align="center" bgcolor="#bbffbb"
| 76 || June 26 || Mariners || 5–4 || || || || || 42–34
|- align="center" bgcolor="#ffbbbb"
| 77 || June 27 || @ Dodgers || 4–5 || || || || || 42–35
|- align="center" bgcolor="#bbffbb"
| 78 || June 28 || @ Dodgers || 8–3 || || || || || 43–35
|- align="center" bgcolor="#ffbbbb"
| 79 || June 29 || @ Dodgers || 2–4 || || || || || 43–36
|-

|- align="center" bgcolor="#ffbbbb"
| 80 || July 1 || Giants || 2–3 || || || || || 43–37
|- align="center" bgcolor="#bbffbb"
| 81 || July 2 || Giants || 5–3 || || || || || 44–37
|- align="center" bgcolor="#bbffbb"
| 82 || July 3 || Giants || 9–6 || || || || || 45–37
|- align="center" bgcolor="#ffbbbb"
| 83 || July 4 || @ Astros || 1–4 || || || || || 45–38
|- align="center" bgcolor="#ffbbbb"
| 84 || July 5 || @ Astros || 2–6 || || || || || 45–39
|- align="center" bgcolor="#ffbbbb"
| 85 || July 6 || @ Astros || 4–5 || || || || || 45–40
|- align="center" bgcolor="#bbffbb"
| 86 || July 7 || @ Astros || 7–5 || || || || || 46–40
|- align="center" bgcolor="#bbffbb"
| 87 || July 8 || @ Rockies || 12–2 || || || || || 47–40
|- align="center" bgcolor="#ffbbbb"
| 88 || July 9 || @ Rockies || 0–1 || || || || || 47–41
|- align="center" bgcolor="#bbffbb"
| 89 || July 10 || @ Rockies || 8–5 || || || || || 48–41
|- align="center" bgcolor="#ffbbbb"
| 90 || July 14 || D-backs || 0–6 || || || || || 48–42
|- align="center" bgcolor="#bbffbb"
| 91 || July 15 || D-backs || 10–7 || || || || || 49–42
|- align="center" bgcolor="#bbffbb"
| 92 || July 16 || D-backs || 4–1 || || || || || 50–42
|- align="center" bgcolor="#ffbbbb"
| 93 || July 17 || D-backs || 1–6 || || || || || 50–43
|- align="center" bgcolor="#ffbbbb"
| 94 || July 19 || @ Mets || 1–3 || || || || || 50–44
|- align="center" bgcolor="#ffbbbb"
| 95 || July 20 || @ Mets || 3–7 || || || || || 50–45
|- align="center" bgcolor="#ffbbbb"
| 96 || July 21 || @ Mets || 0–12 || || || || || 50–46
|- align="center" bgcolor="#ffbbbb"
| 97 || July 22 || @ Phillies || 6–8 || || || || || 50–47
|- align="center" bgcolor="#ffbbbb"
| 98 || July 23 || @ Phillies || 0–2 || || || || || 50–48
|- align="center" bgcolor="#ffbbbb"
| 99 || July 24 || @ Phillies || 1–5 || || || || || 50–49
|- align="center" bgcolor="#ffbbbb"
| 100 || July 26 || Cardinals || 2–4 || || || || || 50–50
|- align="center" bgcolor="#bbffbb"
| 101 || July 27 || Cardinals || 2–1 || || || || || 51–50
|- align="center" bgcolor="#ffbbbb"
| 102 || July 28 || Cardinals || 3–11 || || || || || 51–51
|- align="center" bgcolor="#ffbbbb"
| 103 || July 29 || Reds || 3–8 || || || || || 51–52
|- align="center" bgcolor="#ffbbbb"
| 104 || July 30 || Reds || 1–9 || || || || || 51–53
|- align="center" bgcolor="#ffbbbb"
| 105 || July 31 || Reds || 1–7 || || || || || 51–54
|-

|- align="center" bgcolor="#bbffbb"
| 106 || August 2 || @ Pirates || 11–3 || || || || || 52–54
|- align="center" bgcolor="#ffbbbb"
| 107 || August 3 || @ Pirates || 8–9 || || || || || 52–55
|- align="center" bgcolor="#bbffbb"
| 108 || August 4 || @ Pirates || 12–7 || || || || || 53–55
|- align="center" bgcolor="#bbffbb"
| 109 || August 5 || @ Nationals || 6–5 || || || || || 54–55
|- align="center" bgcolor="#bbffbb"
| 110 || August 6 || @ Nationals || 3–2 || || || || || 55–55
|- align="center" bgcolor="#bbffbb"
| 111 || August 7 || @ Nationals || 3–0 || || || || || 56–55
|- align="center" bgcolor="#bbffbb"
| 112 || August 9 || Mets || 8–3 || || || || || 57–55
|- align="center" bgcolor="#ffbbbb"
| 113 || August 10 || Mets || 1–9 || || || || || 57–56
|- align="center" bgcolor="#bbffbb"
| 114 || August 11 || Mets || 2–1 || || || || || 58–56
|- align="center" bgcolor="#ffbbbb"
| 115 || August 12 || Phillies || 2–3 || || || || || 58–57
|- align="center" bgcolor="#ffbbbb"
| 116 || August 13 || Phillies || 2–5 || || || || || 58–58
|- align="center" bgcolor="#ffbbbb"
| 117 || August 14 || Phillies || 3–8 || || || || || 58–59
|- align="center" bgcolor="#bbffbb"
| 118 || August 16 || @ Marlins || 4–2 || || || || || 59–59
|- align="center" bgcolor="#ffbbbb"
| 119 || August 17 || @ Marlins || 0–6 || || || || || 59–60
|- align="center" bgcolor="#ffbbbb"
| 120 || August 18 || @ Marlins || 0–2 || || || || || 59–61
|- align="center" bgcolor="#bbffbb"
| 121 || August 19 || @ Braves || 12–7 || || || || || 60–61
|- align="center" bgcolor="#bbffbb"
| 122 || August 20 || @ Braves || 7–2 || || || || || 61–61
|- align="center" bgcolor="#ffbbbb"
| 123 || August 21 || @ Braves || 2–6 || || || || || 61–62
|- align="center" bgcolor="#ffbbbb"
| 124 || August 22 || Astros || 2–6 || || || || || 61–63
|- align="center" bgcolor="#bbffbb"
| 125 || August 23 || Astros || 2–0 || || || || || 62–63
|- align="center" bgcolor="#bbffbb"
| 126 || August 24 || Astros || 7–4 || || || || || 63–63
|- align="center" bgcolor="#ffbbbb"
| 127 || August 26 || Rockies || 3–4 || || || || || 63–64
|- align="center" bgcolor="#ffbbbb"
| 128 || August 27 || Rockies || 2–4 || || || || || 63–65
|- align="center" bgcolor="#bbffbb"
| 129 || August 28 || Rockies || 4–3 || || || || || 64–65
|- align="center" bgcolor="#ffbbbb"
| 130 || August 29 || D-backs || 5–7 || || || || || 64–66
|- align="center" bgcolor="#bbffbb"
| 131 || August 30 || D-backs || 5–3 || || || || || 65–66
|- align="center" bgcolor="#bbffbb"
| 132 || August 31 || D-backs || 9–5 || || || || || 66–66
|-

|- align="center" bgcolor="#bbffbb"
| 133 || September 1 || @ Brewers || 6–5 || || || || || 67–66
|- align="center" bgcolor="#ffbbbb"
| 134 || September 2 || @ Brewers || 2–12 || || || || || 67–67
|- align="center" bgcolor="#bbffbb"
| 135 || September 3 || @ Brewers || 6–1 || || || || || 68–67
|- align="center" bgcolor="#ffbbbb"
| 136 || September 4 || @ Brewers || 2–3 || || || || || 68–68
|- align="center" bgcolor="#ffbbbb"
| 137 || September 6 || Rockies || 5–6 || || || || || 68–69
|- align="center" bgcolor="#bbffbb"
| 138 || September 7 || Rockies || 4–2 || || || || || 69–69
|- align="center" bgcolor="#bbffbb"
| 139 || September 8 || Rockies || 3–2 || || || || || 70–69
|- align="center" bgcolor="#bbffbb"
| 140 || September 9 || @ Dodgers || 3–1 || || || || || 71–69
|- align="center" bgcolor="#ffbbbb"
| 141 || September 10 || @ Dodgers || 1–3 || || || || || 71–70
|- align="center" bgcolor="#ffbbbb"
| 142 || September 11 || @ Dodgers || 3–7 || || || || || 71–71
|- align="center" bgcolor="#ffbbbb"
| 143 || September 12 || @ Giants || 3–4 || || || || || 71–72
|- align="center" bgcolor="#ffbbbb"
| 144 || September 13 || @ Giants || 4–5 || || || || || 71–73
|- align="center" bgcolor="#bbffbb"
| 145 || September 14 || @ Giants || 5–4 || || || || || 72–73
|- align="center" bgcolor="#ffbbbb"
| 146 || September 16 || Nationals || 1–5 || || || || || 72–74
|- align="center" bgcolor="#bbffbb"
| 147 || September 17 || Nationals || 8–5 || || || || || 73–74
|- align="center" bgcolor="#bbffbb"
| 148 || September 18 || Nationals || 2–1 || || || || || 74–74
|- align="center" bgcolor="#bbffbb"
| 149 || September 19 || @ Rockies || 8–7 || || || || || 75–74
|- align="center" bgcolor="#ffbbbb"
| 150 || September 20 || @ Rockies || 1–20 || || || || || 75–75
|- align="center" bgcolor="#bbffbb"
| 151 || September 21 || @ Rockies || 5–2 || || || || || 76–75
|- align="center" bgcolor="#ffbbbb"
| 152 || September 22 || @ Rockies || 2–4 || || || || || 76–76
|- align="center" bgcolor="#bbffbb"
| 153 || September 23 || @ D-backs || 5–3 || || || || || 77–76
|- align="center" bgcolor="#ffbbbb"
| 154 || September 24 || @ D-backs || 5–8 || || || || || 77–77
|- align="center" bgcolor="#ffbbbb"
| 155 || September 25 || @ D-backs || 3–4 || || || || || 77–78
|- align="center" bgcolor="#ffbbbb"
| 156 || September 26 || Giants || 2–3 || || || || || 77–79
|- align="center" bgcolor="#bbffbb"
| 157 || September 27 || Giants || 9–6 || || || || || 78–79
|- align="center" bgcolor="#bbffbb"
| 158 || September 28 || Giants || 9–1 || || || || || 79–79
|- align="center" bgcolor="#bbffbb"
| 159 || September 29 || Giants || 1–0 || || || || || 80–79
|- align="center" bgcolor="#bbffbb"
| 160 || September 30 || Dodgers || 3–1 || || || || || 81–79
|-

|- align="center" bgcolor="#ffbbbb"
| 161 || October 1 || Dodgers || 1–2 || || || || || 81–80
|- align="center" bgcolor="#bbffbb"
| 162 || October 2 || Dodgers || 3–1 || || || || || 82–80
|-

Postseason Game Log

|- align="center" bgcolor="#ffbbbb"
| 1 || October 4 || @ Cardinals || 5–8 || || || || || 0–1
|- align="center" bgcolor="#ffbbbb"
| 2 || October 6 || @ Cardinals || 2–6 || || || || || 0–2
|- align="center" bgcolor="#ffbbbb"
| 3 || October 8 || Cardinals || 4–7 || || || || || 0–3
|-

Notable transactions
June 7, 2005: Josh Geer was drafted by the San Diego Padres in the 3rd round of the 2005 amateur draft. Player signed July 1, 2005.

Roster

Player stats

Batting

Starters by position
Note: Pos = Position; G = Games played; AB = At bats; H = Hits; Avg. = Batting average; HR = Home runs; RBI = Runs batted in

Other batters
Note: G = Games played; AB = At bats; H = Hits; Avg. = Batting average; HR = Home runs; RBI = Runs batted in

Pitching

Starting pitchers
Note: G = Games pitched; IP = Innings pitched; W = Wins; L = Losses; ERA = Earned run average; SO = Strikeouts

Other pitchers
Note: G = Games pitched; IP = Innings pitched; W = Wins; L = Losses; ERA = Earned run average; SO = Strikeouts

Relief pitchers
Note: G = Games pitched; W = Wins; L = Losses; SV = Saves; ERA = Earned run average; SO = Strikeouts

Award winners
 Jake Peavy, National League Strikeout Champion (216)
 Trevor Hoffman, NL Pitcher of the Month (May 2005)
2005 Major League Baseball All-Star Game
 Jake Peavy

2005 NLDS

Game 1, October 4
Busch Stadium II in St. Louis, Missouri

Game 2, October 6
Busch Stadium II in St. Louis, Missouri

Game 3, October 8
Petco Park in San Diego, California

Farm system

References

External links
 2005 San Diego Padres at Baseball Reference
 2005 San Diego Padres at Baseball Almanac
 

National League West champion seasons
San Diego Padres seasons
San Diego Padres Season, 2005
San Diego Padres Season, 2005
San Diego